"So Fine" is the first single from reggae artist Sean Paul's album, Imperial Blaze. The track was premiered on 25 April 2009 on his official website. The official remix features Lomaticc & Sonny Brown in bhangra style.

Music video
The video premiered on 24 June 2009. It was directed by Ray Kay in Miami.

Official versions
"So Fine" (Album Version) – 3:31
"So Fine" Desi Hits Remix (Culture Shock 2) – 4:25

Charts

Weekly charts

Year-end charts

Certifications

References

External links
Sean Paul interview by Pete Lewis, 'Blues & Soul' August 2009

2009 singles
2009 songs
Music videos directed by Ray Kay
Sean Paul songs
Songs written by Sean Paul